Adolph Daniel Edward Elmer (June 14, 1870 – 1942) was an American botanist and plant collector. He was mostly active in the Philippines, his collections being described as new species by both himself and other botanists. The Japanese sent him into Santo Tomas Internment Camp during the Philippines campaign and he died there.

Life and achievements 
Elmer was born on June 14, 1870 in Van Dyne, Wisconsin, United States, to Jacob Van Dyne and Alvina Elmer. He was educated at Washington State College in 1899, married Emma Osterman in 1902 and earned an A.M. from Stanford University in 1903 (or 1904). Festuca idahoensis in 1903). In 1904, he went to the Philippines (an unincorporated territory of the United States at that time), where he consequently made his home through the life. He made extensive plant collections in the Philippines from 1904 to 1927, and also in Borneo. According to Albert William Christian Theodore Herre, Elmer Drew Merrill regarded Adolph Daniel Edward Elmer as the best plant collector working in the Philippines and Southwestern Asia until the beginning of WWII. Merrill gave such reputation with a proof, i.e. .

Death 
Elmer and his wife, Emma, had once planned to leave American-controlled Manila and return to their homeland shortly before the Japanese attack on Pearl Harbor occurred. The Japanese invasion succeeded it in no time and involved the couple, too. Elmer died on April 17 (or in July), 1942 in the Santo Tomas Internment Camp in the Manila, Philippines, of natural causes. His private type collection, held in the Philippine National Herbarium, was destroyed about that time. Emma Osterman Elmer survived internment.

Legacy 
Many taxa are named in honor of Elmer, including   (syn. Adenostylis elmeri ),   (syn. B. peltata , nom. illeg.), Castilleja elmeri ,   (note that at least all of these four examples are based on Elmer's type specimens), and so on.

The genera Adelmeria (Zingiberaceae), Elmera (Saxifragaceae), Elmerinula (Dothideomycetes), and Elmerobryum (Hypnaceae) are also named after him.

Explanatory notes

Citations

General bibliography 
 
 
 
  - its supplemented version (ElmerADE) is available on the website of the National Herbarium of the Netherlands. Accessed: 21 May 2021.

Further reading

External links
 Details - Leaflets of Philippine botany. Archived by Biodiversity Heritage Library, accessed: 21 May 2021.

1870 births
1942 deaths
American botanists
People from Fond du Lac County, Wisconsin
Stanford University alumni
Washington State University alumni
American people who died in Japanese internment camps